The 7th Army was an army level command of the German Army in World War I.  It was formed on mobilization in August 1914 from the II Army Inspection.  The army was disbanded in 1919 during demobilization after the war.

History 
Formed at the outbreak of World War I, 7th Army formed the extreme left (southern) wing of the German Armies on the Western Front.  During the execution of the French Plan XVII, the 7th Army covered Alsace, successfully repulsing the French attack in the Battle of Lorraine.  It then took part in the Race to the Sea, an attempt by both German and Anglo-French armies to turn each other's flank.

At the end of the war it was serving as part of Heeresgruppe Deutscher Kronprinz.

Order of Battle, 30 October 1918 
By the end of the war, the 7th Army was organised as:

Commanders 
The 7th Army had the following commanders during its existence.

Glossary 
Armee-Abteilung or Army Detachment in the sense of "something detached from an Army".  It is not under the command of an Army so is in itself a small army.
Armee-Gruppe or Army Group in the sense of a group within an Army and under its command, generally formed as a temporary measure for a specific task.
Heeresgruppe or Army Group in the sense of a number of armies under one commander.

See also 

7th Army (Wehrmacht) for the equivalent formation in World War II
German Army order of battle (1914)
German Army order of battle, Western Front (1918)
Schlieffen Plan

References

Bibliography 
 
 

07
Military units and formations established in 1914
Military units and formations disestablished in 1919